Kanzelwand (formerly known as Warmatsgundkopf from the Bavarian side) is a mountain on the border between Vorarlberg, Austria and Bavaria, Germany.

Allgäu Alps
Mountains of Bavaria
Mountains of Vorarlberg
Mountains of the Alps